The National Herbarium of Ukraine is a repository of plant specimens, in Kyiv, Ukraine. It was established in 1921 by Professor O. Fomin, who was its first Curator. It is now is part of the M.G. Kholodny Institute of Botany, at the National Academy of Sciences of Ukraine, Kyiv, Ukraine.

Its collection of 2,040,000 specimens includes a number of type specimens, found both in Ukraine and elsewhere, by Ukrainian botanists.

The herbarium is known by the short code KW, with specific sections being known as:

 KW-A - Algotheca (algae)
 KW-B - Bryophytes
 KW-L - Lichens
 KW-M - Mycology herbarium (fungi and fungus-like organisms)
 KW-P - Palynotheca (pollen)

In October 2022, during the Russian invasion of Ukraine, the herbarium was damaged by a Russian missile strike.

References

External links 

 

Ukraine
Scientific organizations based in Ukraine
1921 establishments in Ukraine